The Chronological Table of the Statutes is a chronological list of the public Acts passed by the Parliament of England (1235–1706), the Parliament of Great Britain (1707–1800), and the Parliament of the United Kingdom (from 1801), as well as the Acts of the old Parliament of Scotland (to 1707) and of the modern Scottish Parliament (from 1999), and the Measures passed by the National Assembly for Wales (from 2008) and by the General Synod of the Church of England (from 1920).  It is produced by Her Majesty's Stationery Office (now part of the Office of Public Sector Information) and published by The Stationery Office.

The Chronological Table was first published in 1870, and is issued regularly.   the most recent edition takes the contents up to the end of 2012.

The Chronological Table does not list either Personal or Local Acts, Acts passed by the old Parliament of Ireland (to 1800), Acts passed by the Parliament of Northern Ireland (1921-1972), Measures passed by the short-lived Northern Ireland Assembly (1973–1974), nor Acts passed by the modern Northern Ireland Assembly (from 1999).

The Acts and Measures (other than the Acts of the old Parliament of Scotland) are arranged in order of their chapter number for each session (before 1963) or calendar year.  For each Act or Measure the Table states to what extent, and by what legislation, it has been amended or repealed.

References
John E Pemberton and G Chandler. "Chronological Table of the Statutes" in British Official Publications: Library and Technical Information. Pergamon Press Ltd. Second Revised Edition. 1973. . Page 136 et seq. See also "Index to the Statutes", pages 133 to 136.
Ilbert. Legislative Methods and Forms. 1901. Pages 33, 34, 63, 64, 66, 67 and 196. 
"Notices of New Works" (1873) 37 Justice of the Peace 24 (11 January)

External links
 Chronological table of and index to the statutes to the end of the session of ...,by Hathi Trust Digital Library

Law books
Statutory law